The Cerro del Topo Chico (Spanish, 'Small Mole Hill', from the Latin talpa 'mole') is a mountain and a protected area in the Escobedo, San Nicolás and Monterrey municipalities; state of Nuevo León, Mexico. The summit reaches 1,178 meters above sea level, and it has 618 meters of prominence (Parent: Cerro de las Mitras). The mountain is about 7.5 km long, is a symbol of Escobedo and San Nicolás, and is completely surrounded by Monterrey metropolitan area. It is known for being the source of the Topo Chico mineral water.

See also 
 Cerro de la Silla
 Cerro de Chipinque
 Cerro del Obispado
 Cerro de la Loma Larga
 La Huasteca

References 

Mountains of Mexico
Landmarks in Monterrey
Landforms of Nuevo León